
 
Buxton is a surname of Anglo-Saxon, or Scottish-Gaelic origin, and may refer to

A 
 Adam Buxton (born 1969), British comedian
 Angela Buxton (1934–2020), English tennis player
 Aubrey Buxton, Baron Buxton of Alsa (1918–2009), British soldier, politician, and television executive

B 
 Barclay Fowell Buxton (1860–1946), English evangelist
 Bertha Henry Buxton (1844–1881), British novelist and children's author
 Byron Buxton (born 1993), American baseball player

C 
 Dr C. Lee Buxton (1904–1969), American gynecologist
 Charles Buxton (1823–1871), British politician

 Charles Roden Buxton (1875–1942), English philanthropist and politician
 Christopher Buxton (martyr) (died 1588), English Roman Catholic priest

D 
 Dave Buxton (born 1952), English jazz pianist

E 
 Edward Buxton (conservationist) (1840–1924), British conservationist
 Sir Edward Buxton, 2nd Baronet (1812–1858), British Liberal Party politician

F 
 Felix Buxton, British musician, member of Basement Jaxx
 Francis Buxton (1847–1911), British barrister and Liberal Party politician
 Frank Buxton (1930–2018), American actor and director

G 
 Glen Buxton (1947–1997), American musician
 Godfrey Buxton (1895–1986), missionary training college founder

I 
 Ian Buxton (1938–2010), English footballer and cricketer

J 
 Jake Buxton (born 1985), English professional footballer
 Jedediah Buxton (1707–1772), English mental calculator
 Jeff Buxton, American wrestling coach
 Judy Buxton (born 1950), British actress

L 
 Lewis Buxton (born 1983), English footballer
 Luther Buxton (1822–1897), American physician and politician

M 
 Mick Buxton (born 1943), English football manager

N 
 Nigel Buxton (1924–2015), British travel writer
 Noel Noel-Buxton, 1st Baron Noel-Buxton (1869–1948), British politician, son of Thomas Buxton

P 
 Peter Buxton (born 1978), English rugby union footballer

R 
 Ralph Buxton (1911–1988), Canadian baseball player
 Richard Buxton (botanist) (1786–1865), British shoemaker and amateur botanist
 Sir Richard Buxton (born 1938), British judge
 Dame Rita Buxton (1896–1982), Australian community worker, activist, racehorse owner, and philanthropist
 Robert Buxton (disambiguation)
 Robin Buxton Potts, Canadian politician
 Ron Buxton (1949–2021), Democratic politician from Pennsylvania
 Ronald Buxton (British politician) (1923–2017), British politician

S 
 Samuel R. Buxton (1874–1951), mayor of Newport News, Virginia
 Sarah G. Buxton (born 1965), American actress
 Sarah Buxton (singer) (born 1980), American country singer-songwriter
 Searby Buxton (1832–1919), New Zealand politician
 Steve Buxton (footballer, born 1888) (1888–1953), English football left back
 Steve Buxton (footballer, born 1960), English football forward
 Sydney Buxton, 1st Earl Buxton (1853–1934), British politician

T 
 Sir Thomas Buxton, 1st Baronet (1786–1845), British brewer, politician, and reformer
 Sir Thomas Buxton, 3rd Baronet (1837–1915), British politician and Governor of South Australia
 Sir Thomas Buxton, 4th Baronet (1865–1919), British MP and social reformer
 Tonia Buxton, Greek Cypriot television presenter

V 
 Lady Victoria Buxton (1839–1916), British philanthropist

Buxton surname in Scotland
In Scotland the surname, can be anglicised from the Scottish-Gaelic name, Buchanan, a village in Stirlingshire.

Buxton surname in England
In England the surname Buxton, can derive from Buxton, a spa-town in Derbyshire, meaning to brew stones, bow stones, or the beech town, settlement, or enclouse, or from Buxton, a village in Norfolk, meaning bucc, as in deer, then town, settlement, enclouse. Or from Buckton, parishes in Yorkshire, Northumberland, and Herefordshire, meaning bucc, as in deer, then town, settlement, enclosure.

Distribution
As a surname, Buxton is the 730th most common surname in Great Britain, with 13,135 bearers. It is most common in Staffordshire, where it is the 27th most common surname, with 3,377 bearers. Other concentrations include, Norfolk, (169th,1,705), West Yorkshire, (282nd,1,739), Cheshire, (286th,1,715), Hampshire, (333rd,1,799), Lancashire, (462nd,1,821) and Greater London, (620th,1,821). Other notable concentrations include, North Yorkshire including Middlesbrough, Suffolk, Derbyshire, Nottinghamshire, Greater Manchester, Merseyside, including the City of Liverpool, and South Yorkshire, including the City of Sheffield.

See also
 Buxton
 Buxton baronets
 Baron Noel-Buxton

External links
https://www.forebears.co.uk/surnames/buxton.html

English-language surnames